Grosser Mercedes (correct: Großer Mercedes) is an unofficial name given to two large luxury automobiles made by Mercedes-Benz:
the Mercedes-Benz 770, made from 1930 to 1944, and
the Mercedes-Benz 600, made from 1964 to 1981.

The translation simply means "large" or "grand" Mercedes.